Valencia West is a census-designated place (CDP) in Pima County, Arizona, United States. The population was 9,355 at the 2010 census, a 293% increase over the population of 2,380 in  2000.

Geography
Valencia West is located at  (32.140958, -111.113649).

Demographics

At the 2000 census there were 2,380 people, 676 households, and 548 families living in the CDP. The racial makeup of the CDP was 60.13% White, 1.34% Black or African American, 2.31% Native American, 0.13% Asian, 0.21% Pacific Islander, 32.94% from other races, and 2.94% from two or more races.  68.40% of the population were Hispanic or Latino of any race.
Of the 676 households 50.9% had children under the age of 18 living with them, 56.8% were married couples living together, 17.3% had a female householder with no husband present, and 18.8% were non-families. 15.1% of households were one person and 4.0% were one person aged 65 or older.  The average household size was 3.52 and the average family size was 3.91.

The age distribution was 38.2% under the age of 18, 9.9% from 18 to 24, 28.9% from 25 to 44, 16.8% from 45 to 64, and 6.2% 65 or older.  The median age was 27 years. For every 100 females, there were 102.9 males.  For every 100 females age 18 and over, there were 96.3 males.

The median household income was $28,323 and the median family income  was $27,561. Males had a median income of $21,023 versus $22,955 for females. The per capita income for the CDP was $9,740.  About 26.1% of families and 27.4% of the population were below the poverty line, including 35.4% of those under age 18 and 5.8% of those age 65 or over.

References

Census-designated places in Pima County, Arizona
Populated places in the Sonoran Desert